Pull may refer to:

Sports 
In baseball, a pull hitter is a batter who usually hits the ball to the side of the field from which he bats
 Pull shot, a batting stroke in cricket
 A phase of a swim stroke
 A throw-off in the sport of ultimate (originally called ultimate frisbee)
 The Hope College Pull, an annual tug-of-war competition at Hope College in Holland, Michigan

Music 
 Pull (Winger album) (1993)
 Pull, a 1993 album by Arcwelder
 Pull (Mr. Mister album) (2010)
 "Pull", a song from the album Nico by Blind Melon
 "Pull", a song by Candiria from the album The Process of Self-Development, 1999

Other uses 
 Muscle pull, a strain injury
 Drawer pull or handle
 Pull (philately), impression from a handstamp or die
 Pull (physics), a force that acts in the direction of the origin of the force
 "The Pull", an episode of the TV series Sons of Anarchy

See also 
 Pulling (disambiguation)
 
 
 Push (disambiguation)